Kanyavi is a 2009 Sri Lankan Sinhala drama film directed by Siritunga Perera and produced by Indika Wijeratne for Cine Vision Lanka Films. It stars Sanath Gunathilake and Meena Kumari in lead roles along with Sathischandra Edirisinghe and Pubudu Chathuranga. Music composed by Nadeeka Guruge. The film introduced Dilani Madurasinghe to cinema for the first time. It is the 1132rd Sri Lankan film in the Sinhala cinema.

The film was successfully screened for 60 days at Ritz Borella and other NFC circuit cinema halls around the country.

Plot

Cast
 Sanath Gunathilake as Janaka Senanayake
 Meena Kumari as Imaya Senanayake
 Dilani Madurasinghe as Kumari
 Sathischandra Edirisinghe as Janaka's father
 Pubudu Chathuranga as Madhava
 Hyacinth Wijeratne as Janaka's mother
 Himali Sayurangi as Tharushi Nadeesha
 Seetha Kumari as Somawathi
 Susila Kottage as Mrs. Charlot Sylvester
 Upali Keerthisena as Madhava's servant
 Kapila Sigera as Thug

Soundtrack

References

2009 films
2000s Sinhala-language films
2009 drama films
Sri Lankan drama films